Honky Tonk Time Machine is the thirtieth studio album by American country music artist George Strait. It was released on March 29, 2019, via MCA Nashville. The album's first single, "Every Little Honky Tonk Bar", was released to radio on February 11, 2019.

Content
The album's lead single, "Every Little Honky Tonk Bar", was issued on February 11, 2019. Prior to this, he had released another song, "Código", as a preview. As with his last album Cold Beer Conversation, Honky Tonk Time Machine was co-produced by Chuck Ainlay. The album includes a cover of Johnny Paycheck's "Old Violin". Strait co-wrote most of the songs on the album with his son Bubba Strait and Dean Dillon, who has written many of Strait's singles.

Critical reception
The album was met with largely positive reviews. Stephen Thomas Erlewine of Allmusic rated the album 3.5 out of 5 stars, stating that "Strait sings with humor, tenderness, and ease, qualities that lend the deliberately nostalgic Honky Tonk Time Machine grace, resonance, and depth. Perhaps this isn't a new trick for Strait, but it's one to be cherished nonetheless." Rating it 3 out of 5, Will Hermes of Rolling Stone thought that the strongest songs were " top-shelf boilerplate honky-tonkin'", highlighting the "Old Violin" cover and Willie Nelson duet along with the title track. Mikael Wood of the Los Angeles Times found the album consistent with many of Strait's others, also stating that "as eager as Strait seems to reclaim his commercial clout, the album doesn’t downplay his perspective as an aging grandfather at a moment when country music is dominated by youngsters." His review also noted the "darker themes" of the "Old Violin" cover and "The Weight of the Badge". Kelly Dearmore of Sounds Like Nashville wrote that "Although there’s a range of slow, medium and quick tempo tunes here, the album excels when it’s either twisting and twirling in full-speed, or gently waltzing in a far lower gear." The review praised the lyrics of "Every Little Honky Tonk Bar" and "The Weight of the Badge", along with the performances on "Sing One with Willie", but criticized the lyrics of "Código" and "Blue Water". A review from Country Standard Time was also positive, with Jeffrey B. Remz stating that "The 13 songs are uniformly strong from start to finish."

Commercial performance
Honky Tonk Time Machine debuted at number four on the US Billboard 200, with 51,000 album-equivalent units, including 44,000 pure album sales. It has sold 143,200 copies in the United States as of March 2020.

Track listing

Personnel
Adapted from liner notes.

Musicians
 J. T. Corenflos – electric guitar
 Eric Darken – percussion
 Stuart Duncan – fiddle, mandolin
 Paul Franklin – steel guitar
 Wes Hightower – background vocals
 Brent Mason – electric guitar, classical guitar
 Mac McAnally – acoustic guitar, classical guitar
 Greg Morrow – drums, percussion
 Willie Nelson - duet vocals on "Sing One with Willie"
 Mike Rojas – piano, organ, synthesizer, accordion
 Marty Slayton – background vocals
 George Strait - lead vocals
 Harvey Strait - duet vocals on "God and Country Music"
 Ilya Toshinsky – acoustic guitar
 Glenn Worf – bass guitar

Technical
 Chuck Ainlay – producer, recording, mixing
 Kevin Boettger – recording assistant on "Sometimes Love"
 Buddy Cannon and Steve Chadie – recording (Willie Nelson's vocals on "Sing One with Willie")
 Spencer Clarke – overdubs, mixing assistant
 Jon Harter – overdubs
 Charlie Kramsky – recording assistant (Willie Nelson's vocals on "Sing One with Willie")
 Bob Ludwig – mastering
 Brandon Schexnayder – recording assistant
 George Strait – producer

Charts

Weekly charts

Year-end charts

References

2019 albums
George Strait albums
MCA Records albums
Albums produced by Chuck Ainlay